Lenfilm is a Russian production company with its own film studio located in Saint Petersburg (the city was called Leningrad from 1924 to 1991, thus the name). It is a corporation with its stakes shared between private owners and several private film studios which operate on the premises. Since October 2012, the Chairman of the board of directors is Fyodor Bondarchuk.

History

Before Lenfilm

St. Petersburg was home to several Russian and French film studios since the early 1900s. In 1908, St. Petersburg businessman Vladislav Karpinsky opened his film factory Omnium Film, which produced documentaries and feature films for local theatres. During the 1910s, one of the most active private film studios was Neptun in St. Petersburg, where such figures as Vladimir Mayakovsky and Lilya Brik made their first silent films, released in 1917 and 1918.

Lenfilm's property was originally under the private ownership of the Aquarium garden, which belonged to the merchant Georgy Alexandrov, who operated a restaurant, a public garden and a theatre on the same site. Composer Peter Tchaikovsky came to what was then the Aquarium theatre (and is now Stage # 4 of Lenfilm) as a guest to the 1893 performance of the overture to his ballet The Nutcracker. Famous Russian bass singer Feodor Chaliapin performed there in the 1910s and the early 1920s. Stars of the Soviet era also gave performances there, such as Isaak Dunaevsky, and Leonid Utyosov with his jazz band during the 1920s and 1930s.

Petrograd and Leningrad film industry

The facilities and land of the Leningrad film studio were nationalized in 1918 and it was established as a Soviet state-funded film industry. Within just a few years it bore several different names, such as Petrograd Cinema Committee and  SevZapKino, among various others. In 1923 the nationalized Aquarium garden was merged with SevZapKino and several smaller studios to form the Soviet state-controlled film industry in St. Petersburg. During 1924–1926 it was temporarily named Leningrad Film Factory Goskino and eventually changed its name several times during the 1920s and 1930s.

At that time many notable filmmakers, writers, and actors were active at the studio, such as Yevgeni Zamyatin, Grigori Kozintsev, Iosif Kheifets, Sergei Eisenstein, Sergei Yutkevich, Dmitri Shostakovich, Nikolai Akimov, Yuri Tynyanov, Veniamin Kaverin, Viktor Shklovsky, and the writers of Serapion Brothers, as well as many other figures of Russian and Soviet culture.

Lenfilm

Since 1934 the studio has been named Lenfilm.

During the Soviet era, Lenfilm was the second-largest (after Mosfilm) production branch of the Soviet film industry, which incorporated more than 30 film studios located across the former Soviet Union.

During World War II and the Siege of Leningrad, very few cinematographers remained active in the besieged Leningrad and made film documentaries about the heroic fight against the Nazis. At the same time, most personnel and production units of the Lenfilm studio were evacuated to cities in Central Asia, such as Alma-Ata (1942) and Samarkand. There Lenfilm temporarily merged with other Soviet film studios into the Central United Film Studio (TsOKS). Lenfilm returned to Leningrad in 1944.

Today in the Aquarium Theater there is a stage where many famous Lenfilm pictures were shot and many film stars played their roles. In 1975 George Cukor made a film there called The Blue Bird. Elizabeth Taylor was there, playing Queen of light in that film. Jane Fonda and Ava Gardner also worked there, at Stage # 4, the prior Aquarium Theatre. Orlando was partly filmed there with Tilda Swinton. Afghan Breakdown was shot there by Vladimir Bortko, with Michele Placido, who plays a Russian colonel. In the beginning of the 1990s there were about a dozen famous American scriptwriters and Oscar-winning actors and actresses who worked with Lenfilm.

By the end of the Soviet Union era, Lenfilm had produced about 1,500 films. Many film classics were produced at Lenfilm throughout its history and some of these were granted international awards at various film festivals.

Today

After the dissolution of the Soviet Union, Lenfilm became a quasi-private film production company of Russia, retaining its name in spite of renaming of the city of Leningrad to St. Petersburg.

Lenfilm is tightly connected with world celebrities, such as those mentioned as well as Jane Fonda, Maximilian Schell, Marina Vlady, Julia Ormond, Michael Caine, William Hurt, Sophie Marceau, Sean Bean, Sandrine Bonnaire, Gérard Philipe, and with many great Russians, such as Vladimir Mayakovsky, Dmitri Shostakovich, Alexander Ney, Kirill Lavrov, Daniil Granin, Pavel Kadochnikov, Aleksandr Demyanenko, and Sergey Kuryokhin.

In 2004 Kinostudiya Lenfilm was re-organized into a privately owned company.

In 2007 Kinostudiya Lenfilm, together with Apple IMC, opened the Apple post-production training centre for filmmakers, where Apple computers are used for editing and special effects, as well as for training and certification of film editors in Final Cut Pro 5.1 and other Apple programs.

Timeline and selected filmography 
See :Category:Lenfilm films

 1934: Chapaev / , directed by Brothers Vasilyev
 1947: Zolushka /  (film adaptation of Cinderella)
 1949: Alexander Popov /  (biographical film)
 1954: The Boys from Leningrad / , starring Georgi Vitsin, Vsevolod Kuznetsov, and Pavel Kadochnikov
 1956: Old Khottabych (aka The Flying Carpet) /  directed by Gennadi Kazansky, starring Nikolai Volkov and Alesha Litvinov
 1960: The Lady with the Dog /  directed by Iosif Kheifets, starring Iya Savvina and Aleksey Batalov
 1960: The Queen of Spades /  (film adaptation)
 1962: Amphibian Man /  (film adaptation) directed by Gennadi Kazansky, starring Anastasiya Vertinskaya and Mikhail Kozakov
 1963: Kain XVIII / , directed by Erast Garin (film adaptation)
 1964: Hamlet / , directed by Grigori Kozintsev (drama), the Golden Lion Award at the Venice Film Festival in 1962 nominated and Special Jury Prize winner
 1968: Dead Season /  (spy film), directed by Savva Kulish, and starring Donatas Banionis and Rolan Bykov
1969: Prince Igor, directed by Roman Tikhomirov, and starring Boris Khmelnitsky
 1970: Franz Liszt. Dreams of love /  (drama), directed by Márton Keleti, and starring Imre Sinkovits and Ariadna Shengelaya.
 1971: Dauria / , directed by Viktor Tregubovich (film adaptation) starring Vitaly Solomin and Yefim Kopelyan
 1976: The Blue Bird / , directed by George Cukor (film adaptation) starring Elizabeth Taylor
 1976: Twenty Days Without War / , directed by Aleksei German
 1978: The Lonely Voice of Man / , directed by Alexander Sokurov (drama)
 1980: The Degraded / , directed by Alexander Sokurov (short film)
 1981: The Hound of the Baskervilles / , directed by Igor Maslennikov (film adaptation)
 1982: The Queen of Spades / , directed by Igor Maslennikov (film adaptation)
 1982: Golos / , directed by Ilya Averbakh, (drama) starring Natalya Sayko and Leonid Filatov
 1983: Painful Indifference / , directed by Alexander Sokurov (war film)
 1986: Empire /  , directed by Alexander Sokurov (short film)
 1987: Dead Man's Letters /  (sci-fi)
 1989: Vagrant Bus (The Stray Bus), directed by Joseph Kheifits, drama
 1990: Taxi Blues co-production.
 1991: Afghan Breakdown /  (war film)
 1991: My best friend, General Vasili, son of Joseph Stalin / , directed by Viktor Sadovsky, drama starring Boris Schcherbakov and Vladimir Steklov
 1995: Peculiarities of the National Hunt /  (comedy), directed by Aleksandr Rogozhkin
 1996: Anna Karenina / , directed by Bernard Rose, drama starring Sophie Marceau and Sean Bean, with Alfred Molina and Mia Kirshner
 2010: The Amazing Race 17 had a task in which the teams had to search through piles of filmstrips for a filmstrip from October
 2011: The White Guard / , first adaption of the novel by Mikhail Bulgakov with Konstantin Khabensky and Mikhail Porechenkov. Directed by Sergey Snezhkin
 2012: Sherlock Holmes / , TV series directed by Andrey Kavun, starring Igor Petrenko, Andrei Panin, Mikhail Boyarsky and Ingeborga Dapkūnaitė
 2012: Idolatress / 
 2013: Hard to be a God / 
 2015: Catherine the Great, directed by Igor Zaitsev
 2017: Bird /  (comedy-drama), directed by Ksenia Baskakova

References

External links
 Lenfilm official site

Film production companies of Russia
Film production companies of the Soviet Union
Companies based in Saint Petersburg
Russian film studios
Russian brands
State-owned film companies
Mass media in Saint Petersburg
Companies nationalised by the Soviet Union
Mass media companies established in 1908
1908 establishments in the Russian Empire
Government-owned companies of Russia
Kamennoostrovsky Prospekt